Chiretolpis is a genus of moths in the family Erebidae.

Description
Palpi very minute. Antennae ciliated in both sexes, but long in male than female. Abdomen of female with a large anal tuft. Wings covered with hair like scales. Forewings long, apex produced and rounded. Outer margin very oblique. Veins 7 to 9 stalked and vein 11 anastomosing with vein 12. Hindwings with vein 3 arise from before angle of cell, vein 5 from above angle, veins 6 and 7 stalked and vein 8 from beyond middle of cell.

Species
 Chiretolpis atrifulva
 Chiretolpis bicolorata (Pagenstecher, 1900)
 Chiretolpis elongata
 Chiretolpis erubescens
 Chiretolpis melanoxantha
 Chiretolpis ochracea
 Chiretolpis rhodia
 Chiretolpis signata
 Chiretolpis sinapis
 Chiretolpis unicolor
 Chiretolpis woodlarkiana
 Chiretolpis xanthomelas

References

External links

Nudariina
Moth genera